Queen Hyoui (Hangul: 효의왕후, Hanja: 孝懿王后; 5 January 1754 – 10 April 1821), of the Cheongpung Kim clan (Hangul: 청풍김씨, Hanja: 淸風金氏), was the wife and queen consort of King Jeongjo of Joseon. In 1899, Emperor Gojong posthumously gave her the name of Hyoui, the Kind Empress (효의선황후, 孝懿宣皇后).

Biography
The future Queen Hyoui was born on 5 January 1754 in the twenty-ninth year of King Yeongjo's reign. She was the daughter of Kim Si-muk (Hangul: 김시묵, Hanja: 金時默) and his wife Lady Hong of the Namyang Hong clan (Hangul: 남양 홍씨, Hanja: 南陽 洪氏).  

She married Yi San, then known as the Crown Prince's son, in 1762 at the age of 9, on the tenth day of the second lunar month in the thirty-eighth year of King Yeongjo's reign. It was said that the reason why Lady Kim became the wife of the young crown prince was because she came from the Cheongpung Kim clan; the clan of Queen Myeongseong who was her great-great-grand aunt.

Her younger cousin, Lady Kim, later married a younger brother of Lady Hyegyeong, which then gave her clan more royal connections.

She became Queen Consort upon her husband's accession to the throne in 1776.

Queen Hyoui did not bear King Jeongjo any children, but she adopted the sons of two of her husband's concubines, Royal Noble Consort Ui and Royal Noble Consort Su, as her own. The son of Royal Noble Consort Ui died young, but the son of Royal Noble Consort Su would eventually succeed King Jeongjo on the throne as King Sunjo.

Queen Hyoui outlived her husband, who died in 1800, by 21 years. She died at Jagyeong Hall, Changgyeong Palace, Hanseong, on the ninth day of the third month in the twenty-first year of King Sunjo's reign.

Family
Great-Great-Great-Great-Grandfather
Kim Yuk (Hangul: 김육, Hanja: 金堉) (23 August 1580 – 1 October 1658)
Great-Great-Great-Great-Grandmother
Lady Yun of the Papyeong Yun clan (Hangul: 파평 윤씨, Hanja: 坡平 尹氏), daughter of Yun Geub-ui (Hangul: 윤급의)
Great-Great-Great-Grandfather
Internal Prince Cheongpung, Kim Woo-myeong (청풍부원군 김우명, 淸風府院君 金佑明) (1619 - 1675); father of Queen Myeongseong
Great-Great-Great-Grandmother
Internal Princess Consort Deokeun of the Eunjin Song clan (덕은부부인 은진 송씨, 德恩府夫人 恩津 宋氏) (1622 - 1660)
Great-Great-Grandfather
Kim Seok-yeon (Hangul: 김석연, Hanja: 金錫衍) (1648 – 17 August 1723); younger brother of Queen Myeongseong (Queen Consort to King Hyeonjong)
Great-Great-Grandmother
Lady Yi of the Jeonju Yi clan (전주 이씨, 全州 李氏); sixth daughter of Yi Jeong-han (이정한, 李挺漢) (25 September 1601 – 30 August 1671)
Great-Grandfather
Kim Do-je (Hangul: 김도제, Hanja: 金道濟)
Grandfather
Kim Seong-eung (Hangul: 김성응, Hanja: 金聖應) (1699 - 1764)
 Adoptive grandfather: Kim Seung-jib (김성집, 金聖集)
 Grandmother
 Lady Hong of the Namyang Hong clan (남양 홍씨, 南陽 洪氏)
 Adoptive grandmother: Lady Yi of the Wansan Yi clan (완산 이씨, 完山 李氏)
Father
Internal Prince Cheongwon, Kim Si-muk (청원부원군 김시묵, 淸原府院君 金時默) (1722 - 1772)
 Uncle - Kim Ji-muk (Hangul: 김지묵, Hanja: 金持黙) (1724 - 1799)
 Cousin - Lady Kim of the Cheongpung Kim clan (Hangul: 청풍 김씨, Hanja: 淸風 金氏)
 Uncle - Kim Chi-muk (김치묵, 金峙默)
Mother
 Stepmother: Internal Princess Consort Uichun of the Uiryeong Nam clan (증 의춘부부인 의령 남씨, 贈 宜春府夫人 宜寧 南氏) (1721 - 1746); Kim Si-muk's first wife
 Step grandfather: Nam Jik-gwan (남직관, 南直寬) (1692 - 1761)
 Step grandmother: Lady Yeo of the Hamyang Yeo clan (함양 여씨, 咸陽 呂氏)
 Biological mother: Internal Princess Consort Dangseong of the Namyang Hong clan (당성부부인 남양 홍씨, 唐城府夫人 南陽 洪氏) (? - 1791)
 Maternal Grandfather: Hong Sang-yeon (홍상언, 洪尙彦) (1701 - 1763)
 Maternal Grandmother: Lady Kim of the Uiseong Kim clan (의성 김씨, 義城 金氏)
Siblings
 Older half-brother -  Kim Gi-dae (Hangul: 김기대, Hanja: 金基大) (1738 - 1777)
 Half-nephew - Kim Jong-seon (김종선, 金宗善) (1766 - 1810)
 Older brother: Kim Gi-jong (Hangul: 김기종, Hanja: 金基種)
 Husband 
 King Jeongjo of Joseon (정조, 正祖) (28 October 1752 - 18 August 1800)
 Father-in-law - King Jangjo of Joseon (13 February 1735 – 12 July 1762) (조선 장조) (15 February 1719 – 16 November 1728)
 Legal father-in-law - King Jinjong (조선 진종) (15 February 1719 – 16 November 1728) 
 Mother-in-law - Queen Heongyeong of the Pungsan Hong clan (6 August 1735 – 13 January 1816) (헌경왕후 홍씨)
 Legal mother-in-law - Queen Hyosun of the Pungyang Jo clan (효순왕후 조씨) (8 January 1716 – 30 December 1751)
 Issue 
 Adoptive son: Yi Sun, Crown Prince Munhyo (문효세자, 文孝世子) (13 October 1782 - 6 June 1786)
 Adoptive son: King Sunjo of Joseon (순조대왕, 純祖大王) (29 July 1790 - 13 December 1834) 
 Adoptive daughter-in-law: Queen Sunwon of the Andong Kim clan (순원왕후, 純元王后) (8 June 1789 - 21 September 1857)
 Adoptive grandson: Yi Yeong, Crown Prince Hyomyeong (효명세자, 孝明世子) (18 September 1809 - 25 June 1830)
 Adoptive granddaughter-in-law: Queen Shinjeong of the Pungyang Jo clan (신정왕후, 神貞王后) (21 January 1809 - 4 June 1890)
 Adoptive great-grandson: King Hyeonjong of Joseon (헌종, 憲宗) (8 September 1827 - 25 July 1849)
 Adoptive step great-grandson: King Gojong of Joseon (고종, 高宗) (8 September 1852 - 21 January 1919)
 Adoptive granddaughter: Princess Myeongon (명온공주, 明溫公主) (1810 - 1832)
 Adoptive granddaughter: Princess Bokon (복온공주, 福溫公主) (1818 - 1832)
 Unnamed adoptive grandson; died prematurely (1820 - 1820)
 Adoptive granddaughter: Princess Deokon (덕온공주, 德溫公主) (1822 - 1840)
 Adoptive grandson: King Cheoljong of Joseon (철종대왕, 哲宗大王) (25 July 1834 - 16 January 1864)
 Adoptive daughter-in-law: Queen Cheorin of the Andong Kim clan (철인왕후 김씨, 哲仁王后 金氏) (27 April 1837 - 12 June 1878)

In popular culture
 Portrayed by Kim Chung in the 1989 MBC TV series 500 Years of Joseon: Pa Mun.
Portrayed by Lee Ae-jung in the 1998 MBC TV series The King's Road. 
Portrayed by Park Eun-hye in the 2007 MBC TV series Lee San, Wind of the Palace.
Portrayed by Lee Hyun-jung in the 2014 movie The Throne.

References

1753 births
1821 deaths
Royal consorts of the Joseon dynasty
Korean queens consort
18th-century Korean women
19th-century Korean women